Joanne McNally (born 7 May 1983) is an Irish stand-up comedian, writer and actress. She is a native of Killiney, County Dublin. McNally was the co-host of Republic of Telly for RTÉ and has also appeared on The Late Late Show, The Afternoon Show, Ireland AM, Two Tube and The Commute for RTÉ. She has a weekly agony aunt section on RTÉ 2fm Chris and Ciara show, where she is called 'Dr. Joanne', and her own 'Mack the week' segment on the Eoghan McDermott show on RTÉ 2fm. Joanne co-hosts a podcast called "My Therapist Ghosted Me" with friend Vogue Williams.

Career

McNally performed in her first stage show Singlehood in 2014 where she and seven other people stood on stage and told stories about their love lives. It was here she was spotted by comedian PJ Gallagher who brought her into stand up comedy. Joanne supported Gallagher on his stand up tour Concussion, around Ireland in 2015, and she was then signed by Irish comedy agency Lisa Richards. McNally and Gallagher went on to write and star in a comedy show Separated At Birth, co-written with director Una McKevitt about their adoptions. Separated at Birth sold out Vicar Street in May 2015 and went on a national tour around Ireland. The two were guests on The Late Late Show hosted by Ryan Tubridy on RTÉ One in March 2015.

McNally was cast as the new co-host of RTÉ2 satirical comedy sketch TV show Republic of Telly in October 2015, replacing Jennifer Maguire who left to star in the Irish comedy Bridget & Eamon with Bernard O'Shea. McNally quit the comedy show in June 2016.

McNally was a semi finalist in So You Think You're Funny and Funny Women. She performs at comedy festivals Vodafone Comedy Festival, Cat Laughs, Galway Comedy Carnival, Body & Soul Festival, Jestfest and Bray Comedy Festival.

She wrote and performed her one-woman show Bite Me for the Dublin Fringe Festival, directed by Una McKevitt. The show is a dark comedy based on her experience with eating disorders. The show sold out its five night run in Dublin's Project Arts Centre and was nominated for four awards including Best Performance, Best Production and the First Fortnight Award.  An excerpt from the show was re-printed in The Irish Times and it became the most shared online article that week. She appeared as a guest on RTÉ One's The Tommy Tiernan Show in January 2017 where she talked about the show. McNally will perform Bite Me at the Edinburgh Festival Fringe in Assembly Rooms in Scotland August 2017.

McNally was signed with UK comedy agency Off the Kerb in January 2017. She started gigging in London in February 2017. McNally co-hosts My Therapist Ghosted Me podcast with Vogue Williams. Joanne currently splits her time between Vogue's basement in London and Vogue's house in Howth. She will start her tour for her show "Prosecco Express" in 2022 in UK and Ireland.  which includes multiple sold out dates at Vicar Street in Dublin and the London Palladium.

McNally writes a monthly column for Stellar magazine called "Jo's World".

In April 2022, she appeared in Channel 4's The Big Fat Quiz of Everything.

References

External links

 Official website
 My Therapist Ghosted Me

1983 births
Living people
Irish stand-up comedians
Irish women comedians
People from Dún Laoghaire–Rathdown
Actresses from County Dublin
21st-century Irish comedians